The 1954 South Australian National Football League season was the 75th season of the top-level Australian rules football competition in South Australia.

Minor round

Round 1

Ladder

Finals

Grand Final

References 

SANFL
South Australian National Football League seasons